Ecsenius stigmatura, commonly known as the tail-spot blenny, is a blenny from the Western Pacific. It occasionally makes its way into the aquarium trade. A coppery-coloured fish with a distinct blackish spot at the base of the tail. It has some vibrant colors below the eye which can be made bright pink if threatened. It grows to a size of 6 cm in length.

References

External links
 

stigmatura
Fish described in 1952